The Swiss National Bank (SNB; ; ;) is the central bank of Switzerland, responsible for the nation's monetary policy and the sole issuer of Swiss franc banknotes. The primary goal of its mandate is to ensure price stability, while taking economic developments into consideration.

The SNB is an Aktiengesellschaft under special regulations and has two head offices, one in Bern and the other in Zurich.

History

The bank formed as a result of the need for a reduction in the number of commercial banks issuing banknotes, which numbered 53 sometime after 1826. In the 1874 revision of the Federal Constitution it was given the task to oversee laws concerning the issuing of banknotes. In 1891, the Federal Constitution was revised again to entrust the Confederation with sole rights to issue banknotes.

1905 foundation
The Swiss National Bank was founded under the law of 6 October 1905 ('the National Bank Act'), which entered into force on 16 January 1906. Business was started on 20 June 1907.

World War I
Sometime during World War I (1914–1917) the bank was instructed to release notes of small denomination, for the first time, by the Federal Council of Switzerland.

Interwar years
The Federal Council devalued the Swiss Franc during 1936, and as a result there was made available to the National Bank an amount of money, which the bank subsequently stored in a  reserve for use in future situations of emergency.

World War II 

The Swiss National Bank provided 1.2 billion CHF to the Reichsbank, of this, a value of approximately 780 million CHF of the gold given to the National Bank was gold which had been looted by the forces of Germany. In addition the National Bank also exchanged between 1.2 and 1.6 billion CHF for gold from the Allied forces. During 20 April 1944, gold from the gold reserves of Italy arrived from Como at the railway station within Chiasso.

There is controversy over the role of the Swiss National Bank in the transfer of Nazi gold during World War II. The SNB was the largest gold distribution centre in continental Europe before the war. A study by the U.S. Department of State in 1997 notes that the bank "must have known that some portion of the gold it was receiving from the Reichsbank was looted from occupied countries". This was confirmed by the Swiss Bergier commission in 1998 which concluded that the SNB received US$440 million in gold from Nazi sources, of which US$316 million is estimated to have been looted. The gold from Nazi governorship sources was in the form of lingots containing gold looted from central banks of Europe and gold from Jews executed within the concentration camps established by the machination of the Nazi regime, which the SNB took without knowing these facts at the time, nor inquiring to any great degree in the process of its transfer into the possession of the SNB, according to  Robert Vogler, a former archivist of the SNB.

Post-war 20th century
In 1981 the bank participated in research involving Orell Füssli and an optical research group named Landis+Gyr, on matters of banknote design.

During 1994 the bank was described as a joint-stock company acting under the administration and supervision of the Confederation. It had eight branches and twenty sub-branches within cantons. The governing board had overall executive management of the National Bank, with supervision entrusted to its shareholders, the banks' council, the banks' committee, its local committees and auditing committee. The three members of the governing board together decided the monetary policy of the Swiss National Bank. Towards the end of 1993 it had 566 employees.

2004: formal independence from government
With the inception of Article 99 of the Swiss Federal Constitution, in May 2004, the National Bank achieved formal independence.

2011: euro exchange rate cap
The SNB announced on 6 September 2011 to set a minimum exchange rate of CHF 1.20 per euro and that it would "enforce this minimum rate with the utmost determination and is prepared to buy foreign currency in unlimited quantities" in order to take measures to stem the development of a possible recession. The bank stated the 1.20 exchange rate was defendable as the bank could potentially proceed to mint enough banknotes to control the rate sufficiently.

The SNB announced on 15 January 2015 the euro currency arrangement would end as the euro crisis had passed and the Europeans would be making financial policy changes.

Ownership as of 2021
As of 31 December 2021 78,17% of voting shares are held by public shareholders (cantons, cantonal banks, etc.). The remaining shares are largely in the hands of private persons. Shares of the SNB have been listed at the SIX Swiss Exchange since 1907. As of April 2022, Theo Siegert, a German entrepreneur, holds 5.05% of its stocks, and as such, he is the third-largest shareholder, between the Canton of Vaud (3.401%) and the Canton of Zürich (5.2%). The national bank's statutes, though, limit the voting rights of private investors to 100 shares.

2022 losses
On 9 January 2023 the SNB reported a loss of 132 billion CHF in its annual results for 2022. As many cantons expected dividend payments from the SNB, some cantons had to revise their budgets or even tap their financial reserves. For example, a planned tax decrease in the canton of Thurgau had to be postponed. Likewise, the federal government had budgeted a 666 million CHF income from SNB.

2023 liquidity assistance
Despite the intervention, a bank run occured that week, causing SNB and the Swiss government to fast-track UBS taking over Credit Suisse. To support the acquisition of Credit Suisse by UBS, the SNB offered liquidity assistance of up to US$110 billion.

Responsibilities

The basic governing principles of the Nationalbank are contained within Article 99 of the Federal Constitution, which deals with matters of monetary policy. There are three numbered factors concerning principles explicitly mentioning the Nationalbank, of four altogether shown within the Article. The SNB is therefore obliged by constitutional statute law to act in accordance with the economic interests of Switzerland. Accordingly, the prime function of the Nationalbank is:

The National Bank publishes within its own site a list of research done as work in progress by staff members, which begin at 2004 (2 papers), to 2005 (2), 2006 (11), 2007 (17), 2008 (19), 2009 (16), 2010 (19), 2011 (14), 2012 (16), 2013 (11), 2014 (13), and to 1 August 2015 there is shown nine papers, a list of eight economic studies which relate to the tasks of the bank, listed from 2005, in addition to a bi-annually published update of research, listed from 2012 to the present.

Cash supply and distribution
The National Bank is entrusted with the note-issuing privilege. It supplies the economy with banknotes. It is also charged by the Confederation with the task of coin distribution.

Cashless payment transactions
In the field of cashless payment transactions, the National Bank provides services for payments between banks. These are settled in the Swiss Interbank Clearing (SIC) system via sight deposit accounts held with the National Bank.

Investment of currency reserves
The National Bank manages currency reserves. These engender confidence in the Swiss franc, help to prevent and overcome crises and may be utilized for interventions in the foreign exchange market.

Financial system stability
The National Bank contributes to the stability of the financial system by acting as an arbiter over monetary policy. Within the context of this task, it analyses sources of risk to the financial system, oversees systemically important payment and securities settlement systems and helps to promote an operational environment for the financial sector.

International monetary cooperation
Together with the federal authorities, the National Bank participates in international monetary cooperation and provides technical assistance.

Banker to the Confederation
The Swiss National Bank acts as banker to the Swiss Confederation. It processes payments on behalf of the Confederation, issues money market debt register claims and bonds, handles the safekeeping of securities and carries out money market and foreign exchange transactions.

Statistics
The National Bank compiles statistical data on banks and financial markets, the balance of payments, the international investment position and the Swiss financial accounts.

Policies

Investments 

The Swiss National Bank invests its assets, particularly in the stock market. In 2018, its share portfolio stood at 153 billion Swiss francs.

According to its guidelines, it "avoids shares in companies which produce internationally banned weapons, seriously violate fundamental human rights or systematically cause severe environmental damage".

Since 2016, environmental associations and academics criticize the fact that these investments do not take into account the Paris Climate Agreement (article 2) and are responsible for at least 50 million tons of carbon dioxide emissions in 2017.

Monetary policy 

The Swiss National Bank pursues a monetary policy serving the interests of the country as a whole. It must ensure price stability, while taking due account of economic developments.
Monetary policy affects production and prices with a considerable time lag. Consequently, it is based on inflation forecasts rather than current inflation.

The SNB's monetary policy strategy consists of three elements: a definition of price stability (the SNB equates price stability with a rise in the national consumer price index of less than 2% per year), a medium-term conditional inflation forecast, and, at operational level, a target range for a reference interest rate, which is the Libor for three-month investments in Swiss francs.

Governance

General Meeting of Shareholders 
The general meeting of shareholders is held once a year, usually in April. Owing to the SNB's public mandate, the powers of the shareholders' meeting are not as extensive as in joint-stock companies under private law.

Bank Council 
The Bank Council oversees and controls the conduct of business by the Swiss National Bank and consists of 11 members. Six members, including the President and Vice President, are appointed by the Federal Council, and five by the Shareholders' Meeting. The Bank Council sets up four committees from its own ranks: an Audit Committee, a Risk Committee, a Remuneration Committee and an Appointment Committee.

A list of the Bank Council members is published on the SNB website.

Governing board 
The Swiss National Bank's management and executive body is the governing board. The governing board is responsible in particular for monetary policy, asset management strategy, contributing to the stability of the financial system and international monetary cooperation. The Governing Board consists of three members:

 Chairman: Thomas Jordan
 Vice Chairman: Fritz Zurbrügg
 Member: Andréa M. Maechler

Chairmen of the governing board 
 Heinrich Kundert, 20 June 1907 – 30 November 1915
 August Burckhardt, 1 December 1915 – 26 November 1924
 Gottlieb Bachmann, 1 July 1925 – 15 March 1939
 Ernst Weber, 1 April 1939 – 31 March 1947
 Paul Keller, 1 April 1947 – 31 May 1956
 Walter Schwegler, 1 June 1956 – 31 August 1966
 Edwin Stopper, 1 September 1966 – 30 April 1974
 Fritz Leutwiler, 1 May 1974 – 31 December 1984
 Pierre Languetin, 1 January 1985 – 30 April 1988
 Markus Lusser, 1 May 1988 – 30 April 1996
 Hans Meyer, 1 May 1996 – 31 December 2000
 Jean-Pierre Roth, 1 January 2001 – 31 December 2009
 Philipp Hildebrand, 1 January 2010 – 9 September 2012
 Thomas J. Jordan, Since 18 April 2012

Gold reserves
The SNB manages the official gold reserves of Switzerland, which as of 2008 amount to 1,145 tonnes and are valued at 30.5 billion CHF. The gold is believed to be stored in huge vaults beneath the Federal Square (Bundesplatz) to the north of the federal parliament building in Bern, but the SNB treats the location of the gold reserves as a secret. Independent confirmation of the gold's location was obtained by the Bernese newspaper Der Bund in 2008. It published a photograph of the bullion that a Keystone news agency photographer was allowed to take at the SNB premises in Bern in 2001. Der Bund also quoted a retired official of the city's surveying office as saying that the gold vaults take up an area of roughly half the Federal Square and have a depth of dozens of meters, down to the level of the Aar river. The SNB says that the gold reserves are stored in different safe places in Switzerland (70% -mostly under the Bundesplatz in Berne and at the Bank for International Settlements in Basel) and abroad (i.e. Bank of England and Bank of Canada).

From the latter years of the 1990s until sometime during 2005, the National Bank transferred from its possession (incompetently, when the gold price was at its historic low) half of its gold reserves, following the Nazi gold affair.

See also
 Banking in Switzerland
 Economy of Switzerland
 SARON (Swiss Average Rate Overnight)
 Swiss Financial Market Supervisory Authority (FINMA)
 Swiss gold reserves referendum, 2014
 Swiss sovereign money referendum, 2018

Notes and references

External links
 Official website

Switzerland
Swiss companies established in 1907
Banks established in 1907
National Bank
Companies based in Bern
National Bank
National Bank
Companies listed on the SIX Swiss Exchange
Financial regulatory authorities of Switzerland